McCampbell may refer to:

People with the surname
Artis J. McCampbell (born 1953), American politician
David McCampbell (1910-1996), American pilot

Locations
McCampbell–Porter Airport, an airport in Texas, USA.
Hall-Harding-McCampbell House, a historic house in Tennessee, USA.

Other
USS McCampbell, a ship